Crailinghall is a village near Oxnam in the Scottish Borders area of Scotland, in the former Roxburghshire.

Crailinghall is on the route of the St. Cuthbert's Way and the Roman Heritage Way.

See also
List of places in the Scottish Borders
List of places in Scotland

References
 Geikie, J (1885) 'List of hill forts, intrenched camps, etc. in Roxburghshire on the Scotch side of the Cheviots', Hist Berwickshire Natur Club, vol.10, page 143

External links

CANMORE/RCAHMS record of Crailinghall, Cairn
RCAHMS record of Crailinghall
Geograph image: Cattle and Hay sheds at Crailinghall Farm
Oxnam Kirk website

Villages in the Scottish Borders